The Croatian Democratic Peasant Party ( or HDSS) is a minor agrarian-conservative political party in Croatia.

The party was led by Ivo Lončar, a popular television news reporter who was elected as a member of the 2000-2003 Parliament from the Croatian Peasant Party list; he subsequently left the party and became an independent deputy. In the November 2003 election he led the party list of HDSS and two other smaller parties and managed to retain his seat in the Parliament. The alliance won 1.0% of the popular vote and 1 out of 151 seats.

Since 2006, the party politics shifted from center-right to center. HDSS supports the development of the agrarian sector, free enterprise, as well as the values of tolerance and dialogue.

Electoral history

Legislative

References

External links
 

Conservative parties in Croatia
Political parties established in 1994
1994 establishments in Croatia